Si Agimat, si Enteng Kabisote at si Ako is a 2012 Filipino fantasy, comedy and action film starring Vic Sotto, Ramon "Bong" Revilla Jr. and Judy Ann Santos. The film is a crossover of the Agimat and Enteng Kabisote film franchises. It is a joint production by OctoArts Films, M-Zet Productions, Imus Productions, APT Entertainment and GMA Pictures. It is one of the 8 official entries for the 2012 Metro Manila Film Festival. It was shown on December 25, 2012.

It is a ninth movie installment based on TV sitcom, Okay Ka, Fairy Ko!.

Plot
Agimat (Bong Revilla, Jr.) has been married to his girlfriend (Sam Pinto) after he defeated a barbarian tribe that speaks in palindrome. They decide to live on Earth, alongside Enteng (Vic Sotto) and his family, to experience family life. Meanwhile, Ako (Judy Ann Santos) is a fairy disguised as an environmental activist along with her minions, including a pink Hulk (John Lapus).

Soon after, octopus-looking aliens arrive, infecting and enslaving the barbarian tribe Agimat defeated, turning them into monsters in an attempt to conquer and pollute Earth. Now it is up to Enteng, Agimat and Ako to defeat them, much to the chagrin of the men's respective wives who desire peace.

Production
The movie was first announced in early June when it beat the deadline for the submission of scripts for the aspiring 2012 Metro Manila Film Festival entries. The press conference and contract signing for the movie was held on June 13, 2012, wherein five local producers signed. The signing was done at the UCC Café Greenhills and was attended by Orly Ilacad of OctoArts Films, Rowena Bautista-Mendiola and Andrea Bautista-Ynares of Imus Productions, Mr. Tony Tuviera of APT Entertainment, Vic Sotto of M-Zet Productions and Atty. Annette Gozon-Abrogar of GMA Films. It was also the time that they revealed that Judy Ann Santos will act as the leading lady or the Me in the title. This will be the second movie of Bong Revilla, Jr. and Vic Sotto together following Si Agimat at si Enteng Kabisote. In an interview of Vic Sotto for SunStar, the challenge for them is to create a bigger and more fun movie for everyone. He also stated, "...ang pressure namin ni Bong and Juday ngayon, eh how to put up a very good and enjoyable product and kung papaano namin malalampasan ‘yung huli naming ginawa(The pressure for us is on how we are going to surpass what we’ve done before),". On June 18, 2012, the Metro Manila Development Authority announced that the film is one of the 8 official entries for the film festival. The Greater Manila Theater Operators Association selected the 8 film out of 14 through level of creativity, cultural or historical value, and commercial viability.

Filming
The film began shooting on July 30, 2012, in Ilocos Norte with Bong Revilla, Jr. On an interview of Revilla on a Saturday talkshow Startalk on August 18, 2012, he revealed that they already completed 40% of the movie. Revilla also revealed that they are the first movie to have a shoot at the "Kapurpurawan" (white) rock formations in Burgos, Ilocos Norte.

Cast

Main Cast
Vic Sotto as Enteng Kabisote
Bong Revilla, Jr. as Agimat
Judy Ann Santos as Angelina Kalinisan-Orteza (Ako)
Gwen Zamora as Faye Kabisote
Sam Pinto as Samara

Supporting Cast
Oyo Boy Sotto as  Benok Kabisote
Aiza Seguerra as Aiza Kabisote 
Mikylla Ramirez as Ada Kabisote
Jose Manalo as Bodyguard Jose
Wally Bayola as Bodyguard Boggart
Ruby Rodriguez as Amy 
Amy Perez as Ina Magenta
Bing Loyzaga as Satana/Amarillo 
Jackie Rice as Munyita 
Denise Laurel as Lakasta 
Ryzza Mae Dizon as Chichay
Sweet as Che/Pink Hulk
Jolo Revilla as Makisig
Jillian Ward as Bebeng
Yassi Pressman as Sol/Winged Horse

Extended Cast
Jimmy Santos as Jimboy
Jinri Park as Jim Girl
TJ Trinidad as Byron 
Alden Richards as Fino
Zea Usi as Marian (Engkantada)
King Gutierrez as Upaw
Edwin Reyes as Abawa
Jeffrey Santos as Punk #1
Rico Barrera as Punk #2
Michael Conan as Punk #3
Jun Cabatu as Cabatu
Marc Pingris as Sakuragi
Ronald Tubid as Tubid
Thou Reyes as Batoktok
Val Sotto as Coach Meg-B
Princess Velasco as Queenie
Nica Peralejo as Nica

Special Guest
Sofia Aznar as Sofia
Patrick Aznar as Patrick
Rez Cortez  as Rez
Kiray Celis  as Kiray
Igiboy Flores as Igiboy
Derrick Monasterio as Derrick
Barbie Forteza as Barbie
Joyce Ching as Joyce
Anton Revilla as Anton
Gian Sotto as Gian
Dianne Medina as Dianne
IC Mendoza as IC
Wahoo Sotto as Wahoo
Ryan Agoncillo as Ryan
Krystal Reyes as Krystal
Lexi Fernandez as Lexi
Kuya Manzano as Alejandro

Reception

Critical
In a review for Rappler.com, Carljoe Javier declared that the film did not surprise him other than the fact that it was extremely politically incorrect. He also pointed out that the movie had commercials inserted in it and that the storyline lacked a clear narrative.

At ClickTheCity.com, Philbert Ortiz Dy declared "Si Agimat, Si Enteng, at Si Ako is utterly unnecessary. There are already several movies just like it in existence, ones with less blatant product placement and a less skeevy overall tone. The people involved in the picture seem to be producing it completely out of inertia at this point, just going through the motions for another year, hoping to lure in people based on name recognition alone."

Box Office
As of December 26, 2012, this movie had P47,700,000, with Vice Ganda, Ai-Ai de las Alas and Presidential sister Kris Aquino's Sisterakas at #1, which had P71,200,000 gross, earning the 1st-place position for two consecutive days so far.

See also
 Okay Ka, Fairy Ko! (film series)
2012 Metro Manila Film Festival

References

External links
 

Enteng Kabisote
2012 films
2010s Tagalog-language films
OctoArts Films films
APT Entertainment films
GMA Pictures films
M-Zet Productions films
Films directed by Tony Y. Reyes